The Quitman Home Economics Building is a historic school building on 2nd Avenue in Quitman, Arkansas.  It is a single story masonry structure, with walls of fieldstone and brick trim around the openings.  The roof is gabled, with exposed rafter ends, and a shed-roof extension over the main entrance, supported by large brackets, all in the Craftsman style.  It was built in 1938 with funding from the National Youth Administration.

The building was listed on the National Register of Historic Places in 1992.

See also
National Register of Historic Places listings in Cleburne County, Arkansas

References

School buildings on the National Register of Historic Places in Arkansas
National Register of Historic Places in Cleburne County, Arkansas
National Youth Administration
School buildings completed in 1938
New Deal in Arkansas
Education in Cleburne County, Arkansas
1938 establishments in Arkansas
Home economics education